St Agnes' Church is a parish church in the Church of England located in St Agnes, Isles of Scilly, UK.

History
The Anglican church is dedicated to St Agnes of Rome. The first church was built in the sixteenth or seventeenth century, but it was destroyed in a gale. It was rebuilt in the eighteenth century, but was again destroyed.

The current building was built by the islanders in the nineteenth century using the proceeds of the sale of a wreck, and the bell in the church was taken from that wreck. It is a Grade II listed building.

In 1821 a new west gallery and two new pews in the chancel were added by Bernard S. Herris.

Parish structure
St Agnes' Church is within the United Benefice of the Isles of Scilly parishes, comprising 
All Saints' Church, Bryher
St Martin's Church, St Martin's
St Mary's Church, St Mary's
St Mary's Old Church, St Mary's
St Nicholas's Church, Tresco

References

Church of England church buildings in the Isles of Scilly
Grade II listed churches in Cornwall
St Agnes, Isles of Scilly